Ceracanthia schausi is a species of snout moth. It was described by Carl Heinrich in 1956 and is known from Costa Rica and Belize.

References

Moths described in 1956
Phycitinae